Texas A&M University – Texarkana (A&M–Texarkana) is a public university in Texarkana, Texas. It is part of the Texas A&M University System.

Students who reside in Oklahoma and Arkansas attend at in-state tuition rates, and historically 30 percent of the student body is from Arkansas. Louisiana residents who reside in a parish that borders Texas may also attend at in-state tuition rates.

History 
A&M–Texarkana first opened with 323 students in 1971 as East Texas State University Center at Texarkana, an upper-level branch of the main East Texas State University (ETSU) in Commerce, Texas. It originally shared a campus with local community college Texarkana College and "was established to provide third and fourth year college instruction for people residing in an isolated region." The university received separate accreditation in 1980, and when ETSU joined the Texas A&M System as Texas A&M University–Commerce in September 1996, the Texarkana branch became a separate institution and was renamed to Texas A&M University–Texarkana.

The university became a four-year college with graduate programs in 2010, moving to its new and current campus near Bringle Lake Park.

In the late 2010s, the university received large funding grants from the state legislature, including $32 million worth of building construction in 2016, supported by State Representative Gary VanDeaver and Speaker of the Texas House Joe Straus, and a 2019 $3.6 million funding addition for new academic programs, including support from VanDeaver and State Senator Bryan Hughes.

As a response to the COVID-19 pandemic in the United States, the university transitioned to online classes for the spring 2020 semester and donated test kits to local hospitals.

Academics 
A&M–Texarkana is a member of the Texas A&M University System and is governed by its Board of Regents. The university's current president is Dr. Emily Cutrer, and provost Dr. Melinda Arnold is the academic head.

A&M–Texarkana is organized into two academic colleges which both offer undergraduate and graduate programs, the College of Arts, Sciences and Education and the College of Business, Engineering and Technology. Combined, the colleges provide 18 undergraduate majors, 20 master's degree programs, and several Extended Education and Community Development programs (for certifications without a degree).

In 2013, A&M–Texarkana and Northeast Texas Community College signed a matriculation agreement between their bachelor and associate nursing programs, respectively, followed by a dual admissions agreement between A&M-Texarkana and Texarkana College in 2014, and one between A&M–Texarkana and Paris Junior College in 2015.  The College of Arts, Sciences and Education is partnered with all three of the above as well as Collin College.

In 2015, local ophthalmic group Texarkana Eye Associates partnered with the university to offer an ophthalmic assistant/optician training course, which was then offered beginning in 2016 as a professional (not for credit) course.

In 2019 the History department launched the Red River Center for Regional History and Culture to support the collection, preservation, exchange, and dissemination of locally and regionally significant materials relating to history and culture in the Red River area, including southeast Oklahoma, northeast Texas, southwest Arkansas, and northwest Louisiana.

In 2020, A&M–Texarkana announced that it would launch a Bachelor of Science in Mechanical Engineering 2020 beginning fall 2020.

Campus

The Texarkana metropolitan area is located one hour (72 miles) from Shreveport, Louisiana, two hours (145 miles) from Little Rock, Arkansas, and less than three hours (180 miles) from Dallas, Texas.

Until 2010, the university shared the same campus with Texarkana College. On this campus, buildings included the construction of the A. M. and Welma Aikin Learning Center in 1978, a library in 1983, and a Center for Professional Development in 1985.

In 2004, the university acquired 375 acres of land as a gift from the City of Texarkana, Texas (300 acres), and the Anita and Truman Arnold Foundation (75 acres). The university received funding from the Texas Legislature for construction of buildings at the new campus near Bringle Lake in Texarkana, Texas.

Construction of the new campus began in 2006. Six buildings have been built: Science & Technology, University Center, Central Plant, Bringle Lake Village, the Student Recreation Center, and the Building for Academic and Student Services, completed in 2019. Bringle Lake Village is a 294-bed furnished residence hall that features many amenities, including an in-ground swimming pool, sand-volleyball court and fitness center. Students have three floor plans from which to choose.

Its library is named after founding president Dr. John F. Moss.

Athletics
The Texas A&M–Texarkana (TAMUT) athletic teams are called the Eagles. The university is a member of the National Association of Intercollegiate Athletics (NAIA), primarily competing in the Red River Athletic Conference (RRAC) since the 2016–17 academic year. The Eagles previously competed as an NAIA Independent within the Association of Independent Institutions (AII) from 2014–15 (the same season when it began its athletics program and joined the NAIA) to 2015–16.

TAMUT competes in 11 intercollegiate varsity sports: Men's sports include baseball, basketball, cross country, soccer and tennis; while women's sports include basketball, cross country, soccer, softball, tennis and volleyball.

History
The university added the intercollegiate athletics program in 2014 with women's soccer and men's & women's tennis. Texas A&M–Texarkana continued to expand the offerings with baseball in 2015, and men's soccer in 2016. It also announced the addition of softball in 2017. The university announced the addition of men's and women's basketball for the 2019–20 academic year, bringing the total number of intercollegiate sports to eight.

Accomplishments
Both the men's baseball and women's soccer teams have made appearances in post-season tournaments. In addition, nearly all of the sports teams have appeared in RRAC conference tournaments, and the men's tennis team has appeared in the NAIA national tournament.

Student life
There are over 30 recognized student organizations at A&M–Texarkana.

National honorary societies
 Beta Beta Beta (Biology)
 Chi Sigma Iota (Counseling)
 Delta Mu Delta (Business)
 Kappa Delta Pi (Education)
 Phi Alpha Theta (History)
 Psi Chi (Psychology)
 Sigma Tau Delta (English)
 Alpha Chi (Honors)

Fraternities and sororities
 Omega Delta Chi sorority
 Zeta Phi Beta sorority
 Alpha Sigma Alpha sorority
 Phi Lambda Chi fraternity

Notable people

Alumni
 Stephen J. Frost, BS-History, Democratic member of the Texas House of Representatives from Maud
 Martha Whitehead, MBA, Former Mayor of Longview, Texas and Texas State Treasurer
 Erwin Cain, BS, Republican member of the Texas House of Representatives from Sulphur Springs
 Bob Bruggeman, BBA, Mayor of Texarkana, Texas

Faculty
Benjamin Neuman, Biologist and Coronavirus expert
 Parag K. Lala, Electrical Engineer and textbook author

References

External links

 
 TAMUT athletics website

 
Buildings and structures in Bowie County, Texas
Education in Bowie County, Texas
Two year upper class colleges
Universities and colleges accredited by the Southern Association of Colleges and Schools